Schulem Rubin (June 26, 1926 - June 21, 2001) served "three successive New York governors ... for more than two decades" as "Director of the Kosher Law Enforcement Division" of the New York State Department of Agriculture and Markets, a position whose responsibilities included appearance in court, defending New York States' kosher laws.

He also served as rabbi of Young Israel of Pelham Parkway. In 1972 his attempt to visit American Jewish soldiers held in North Vietnam was declined, but a "Hanoi spokesman also denied that Rabbi Rubin’s request .. had been rejected.

Young Israel of Pelham Parkway
Rubin served as a synagogue rabbi "for a half century .. at the time one of the largest" Orthodox synagogues in the Bronx.

Kosher Law Enforcement Division
The Washington Post published an interview in which Rubin noted that the higher price of kosher chicken is even higher "right before a holiday."

The New York Times printed in 2005 that inspectors were "annually visiting about 4,000 businesses that dealt in kosher products in the state." As of 1986 there were 12 inspectors, and they found red-handed evidence of improper soaking/salting of meats sold in stores claiming that their meats are kosher. His testimony involved some challenging situations and not all of them resulted in an immediate "win."

The division also operates a consumer-searchable online database.

Personal
Rubin, described as "a Lanzhuter einekel,
was born in Poland.

His Jewish education was at Yeshiva Chaim Berlin, from which he received rabbinical ordination.

Four children were born while he was married (1950-1971) to Chana Bunim Rubin Ausubel. In 1972 he married Helena (knee Blumenfrucht).

References

1926 births
2001 deaths
American Orthodox rabbis
American people of Polish-Jewish descent
20th-century American rabbis
21st-century American rabbis